The European Higher Education Area (EHEA) was launched in March 2010, during the Budapest-Vienna Ministerial Conference, on the occasion of the 10th anniversary of the Bologna Process.

As the main objective of the Bologna Process since its inception in 1999, the EHEA was meant to ensure more comparable, compatible and coherent higher education systems in Europe. Between 1999 and 2010, all the efforts of the Bologna Process members were targeted to creating the European Higher Education Area, which became reality with the Budapest-Vienna Declaration of March 2010. In order to join the EHEA, a country must sign and ratify the European Cultural Convention treaty.

Denmark was the first country outside the UK and the US to introduce the 3+2+3 system.

General objectives 
The key objectives are promoting the mobility of students and staff, the employability of graduates and the European dimension in higher education. Coping with the diversity of their national systems, the EHEA members agree to adopt:

 A common system of easily readable and comparable diplomas;
 A framework based mainly on three main cycles: bachelor, master, doctorate;
 A common quality assurance system.

The main actions of the European Area

Student mobility and mutual recognition of diplomas 
Student mobility implies a coherent system of studies and diplomas:

 The ECTS credit system facilitates the recognition of study periods between EHEA institutions. An academic year normally corresponds to the validation of 60 credits; one credit needs approximately 25 to 30 hours of student work (courses, projects, personal work, etc.).
 The European Qualifications Framework defines 3 main cycles (first cycle, second cycle and third cycle). Each cycle is defined by the number of credits required and the description of the learning outcomes and skills expected for each graduate:
 The first cycle (180 to 240 ECTS credits), generally leading to the bachelor’s degree.
 The second cycle (60 to 120 ECTS credits), generally leading to the master's degree.
 The 3rd cycle, leading to the Doctorate degree.
 In 2018, a short cycle was introduced (90 to 120 ECTS).

Quality assurance 
The European area does not aim to standardize national higher education systems, but to make them more readable and to build mutual trust between higher education institutions. The mutual recognition of diplomas is based, not on the comparison of the content of the programs, but on the definition and validation of the targeted learning outcomes. From its origin, the need for a common quality assurance system arose in the EHEA. The European Association for Quality Assurance in Higher Education (ENQA) was responsible for defining the standards and guidelines, which are broken down into 3 chapters:

 Internal quality assurance in institutions: each institution must have a policy and an internal organization of self-assessment and continuous improvement, implemented with all its stakeholders (students, staff, former graduates and representatives of society and employers).
 External quality assurance: institutions must submit their organization and results to external and independent evaluations (including accreditation agencies).
 Quality assurance of accreditation agencies: the agencies must act in full autonomy (in particular from public or private powers) to evaluate the institutions and their training, and to bring the results to the attention of the public.

European programs

Erasmus and Erasmus Mundus programs 
The Erasmus and Erasmus Mundus Programs are initiatives of the European Union to promote the mobility of students and teachers. They therefore primarily concern the 27 countries of the Union, with which other countries such as Norway, Iceland and Turkey have joined forces. Strictly speaking, these are not programs of the European Area, but they largely contribute to its development.

"European Universities" initiative 
In 2017, the European Union launched the "European Universities" initiative, aimed at "strengthening, throughout the EU, strategic partnerships between higher education institutions and encouraging the emergence, by 2024, of some twenty European universities"; in fact more than 40 have been already created. These universities are networks of high-level universities, which will allow students to obtain a diploma by combining studies in several EU countries and which will contribute to the international competitiveness of European higher education.

Members
Participating member states of the European Higher Education Area are:

Countries eligible to join:

Public international law standards
 Lisbon Recognition Convention (Lisbon, 4 July 1997)
 Article 2 of the first Protocol to the European Convention on Human Rights (Paris, 20 March 1952)
 Article 10 of the European Social Charter (revised, Strasbourg, 3 May 1996)

Documents
Main documents

Colleges and universities in Europe
 League of European Research Universities

Lists of colleges and universities in Europe

Note
The two first sections are widely extracted from the French Wikipedia page Espace Européen de l'Enseignement Supérieur, with its list of  authors

See also
 Directorate-General for Education and Culture
 Bologna process
 Diploma Supplement
 Erasmus programme
 European Credit Transfer System (ECTS)
 Homologation
 :Category:Lists of universities and colleges
 European Research Area (ERA)
 TEMPUS
 Lisbon Recognition Convention

References

External links

The Official European Higher Education Area website 2010-2020
The Bologna Declaration
European Cultural Convention (Paris, 19 December 1954)
EUNIS (European University Information Systems)

Higher education organisations based in Europe
Lists of universities and colleges in Europe